Qeshlaq-e Hameh Kasi (also Romanized as Qeshlāq-e Hameh Kasī; also known as Gheshlaghé Hamehkasi and Qeshlāq) is a village in Salehabad Rural District, Salehabad District, Bahar County, Hamadan Province, Iran. At the 2006 census, its population was 441, in 106 families.

References 

Populated places in Bahar County